Ildikó Pádár (born 19 April 1970 in Heves) is a Hungarian retired handball player and Olympic medalist. She received a bronze medal at the 1996 Summer Olympics in Atlanta. She received a silver medal at the 2000 Summer Olympics in Sydney.

References

1970 births
Living people
Hungarian female handball players
Olympic silver medalists for Hungary
Olympic bronze medalists for Hungary
Handball players at the 1996 Summer Olympics
Handball players at the 2000 Summer Olympics
Olympic medalists in handball
Medalists at the 2000 Summer Olympics
Medalists at the 1996 Summer Olympics
People from Heves
Sportspeople from Heves County